The 1936 Football Championship of UkrSSR were part of the 1936 Soviet republican football competitions in the Soviet Ukraine.

Persha Hrupa

Druha Hrupa
1/4 finals
 Mykolaiv — Horlivka 3 : 1
 Kadiivka — Voroshylovhrad 3 : 4
 Zaporizhia — Kostiantynivka + : -
 Vinnytsia — Chernihiv 4 : 1

1/2 finals
 Mykolaiv — Voroshylovhrad 4 : 0
 Zaporizhia — Vinnytsia + : -

the 3rd place game
 Voroshylovhrad — Vinnytsia 1 : 0

the final game
 Mykolaiv — Zaporizhia 2 : 0

Notes: 
 Kostiantynivka was admitted to the All-Union competition and therefore Zaporizhia received bye.

Tretia Hrupa

1/4 finals
 Dniprodzerzhynsk — Kherson 3 : 0
 Kupyansk — Artemivsk 6 : 0
 Kryvyi Rih — Poltava 6 : 1
 Kamianets-Podilsk — Zhytomyr 4 : 3

1/2 finals
 Dniprodzerzhynsk — Kupyansk 4 : 0
 Kryvyi Rih — Kamianets-Podilsk 5 : 1

the 3rd place game
 Kupyansk — Kamianets-Podilsk + : - (no show)
 
the final game
 Dniprodzerzhynsk — Kryvyi Rih 4 : 1

Notes:
 Artemivsk withdrew after the season.

Chetverta Hrupa

1/8 finals
 Starobilsk — Voroshylovsk 0 : 2
 Makiivka — Melitopol + : - (no show)
 Berdychiv — Korosten + : -
 Kremenchuk — Kirovo 7 : 4
 Ordzhonikidze — Postysheve + : - (no show)
 Chystiakove — Krasnyi Luch 2 : 1

1/4 finals
 Voroshylovsk — Makiivka 2 : 1
 Sumy — Berdychiv 5 : 2
 Mohyliv-Podilskyi — Kremenchuk 2 : 1
 Ordzhonikidze — Chystiakove 6 : 0

1/2 finals
 Voroshylovsk — Sumy 3 : 1
 Mohyliv-Podilskyi — Ordzhonikidze 2 : 1

the 3rd place game
 Sumy — Ordzhonikidze + : - (no show)

the final game
 Voroshylovsk — Mohyliv-Podilskyi 3 : 1.

Ukrainian clubs at the All-Union level
The Ukrainian SSR was presented with 11 teams of masters (exhibition teams) at the All-Union level: 
 Group A (1): Dynamo Kyiv
 Group B (3→1): Silmash Kharkiv, Dynamo Dnipropetrovsk, Dynamo Kharkiv
 Group V (4→3) (5): Dynamo Odesa, Spartak Kharkiv, Ugolschiki Stalino, Lokomotyv Kyiv
 Group G (3) (4): Traktor Factory Kharkiv, Stal Dnipropetrovsk, Stal Kostiantynivka

See also
 1936 Cup of the Ukrainian SSR

Notes

References

External links
 1936. Football Championship of the UkrSSR (1936. Первенство УССР.) Luhansk Nash Futbol.
 1936 (1936 год). History of Soviet championships among KFK.

Ukraine
Football Championship of the Ukrainian SSR
Championship